American alternative rock group Luscious Jackson has released four studio albums (including one children's album), one EP, eleven singles and one official compilation album.

Albums

Studio albums

Compilation album

Extended play

Singles

Music videos

Appearances
 "Love Is Here" was released on the A Life Less Ordinary Soundtrack (1997)

Notes

References

Alternative rock discographies
Discographies of American artists